The Muffs is the debut album by the pop punk band The Muffs, released on May 11, 1993 on Warner Bros. Records. The album contains the single "Big Mouth". "Everywhere I Go" was later used in a popular Fruitopia television commercial (the cassette version of the track is actually the demo; the band was torn between which version to release and ended up splitting the difference).

Reception
"There's a certain charm to the group's 3-chord riffing and primitive rhythms that seems to have most appeal when driving a vehicle beyond the posted speed limit on a hot, sunny day. But stretched over 16 tracks, the forced minimalism begins to wane in appeal." (Roch Parisien, Allmusic)

Track listing
All tracks written by Kim Shattuck, except where noted

"Lucky Guy"  – 2:46
"Saying Goodbye" – 2:16
"Everywhere I Go" – 3:12
"Better Than Me" – 2:48
"From Your Girl" – 3:27
"Not Like Me" – 3:08
"Baby Go Round" – 2:47
"North Pole" (Barnett) – 0:35
"Big Mouth" – 1:51
"Every Single Thing" – 2:22
"Don't Waste Another Day" – 2:35
"Stupid Jerk" (Mike Saunders) – 0:31
"Another Day" – 2:16
"Eye to Eye" (Shattuck, Vammen) – 3:30
"I Need You" (Barnett, Shattuck) – 3:41
"All for Nothing" – 3:20

Personnel
 Kim Shattuck – Lead Guitar, Vocals
 Ronnie Barnett – Bass
 Melanie Vammen – Rhythm Guitar
 Criss Crass – Drums
 Korla Pandit – Organ
 Rob Cavallo – Producer
 David Katznelson – Producer
 The Muffs – Producer

References

The Muffs albums
1993 debut albums
Warner Records albums